Azhnakin (masculine) or Azhnakina (feminine) is a Russian last name. A variant of this last name is Azhnin/Azhnina (/).

It derives from a patronymic which itself is derived from the nicknames "" (Azhnaka) and "" (Azhnya), which was given to people who overused the word "" (azhno), meaning even, so. It may also be related to the dialectal word "" (azhnok), meaning a Great Russian from the south, especially from Kaluga.

References

Notes

Sources
И. М. Ганжина (I. M. Ganzhina). "Словарь современных русских фамилий" (Dictionary of Modern Russian Last Names). Москва, 2001. 



Russian-language surnames